Jason Potts may refer to:
 Jason Potts (economist)
 Jason Potts (politician)